The 1963 Canadian federal election was held on April 8, 1963 to elect members of the House of Commons of Canada of the 26th Parliament of Canada. It resulted in the defeat of the minority Progressive Conservative (Tory) government of Prime Minister John Diefenbaker, with the Liberals returning to power for the first time in 6 years, where they would remain for twenty of the next twenty-one years (winning every election except the 1979 election until their landslide defeat in 1984).  For the Social Credit Party, despite getting their highest ever share of the vote, the party lost 6 seats compared to its high-water mark in 1962.

Overview
During the Tories' last year in office, members of the Diefenbaker Cabinet attempted to remove him from the leadership of the party, and therefore from the Prime Minister's office. In addition to concern within the party about Diefenbaker's mercurial style of leadership, there had been a serious split in party ranks over the issue of stationing American nuclear missiles (see Bomarc missile) on Canadian soil for protection from possible Soviet attack. Diefenbaker and his allies opposed this proposal, while many other Conservatives and the opposition Liberal Party were in favour. Minister of National Defence Douglas Harkness resigned from Cabinet on February 4, 1963, because of Diefenbaker's opposition to accepting the missiles.

When it turned out that nearly half of his cabinet was also prepared to resign over the issue, Diefenbaker announced that he himself would resign with immediate effect and recommend that the Governor General appoint Minister of Justice Donald Fleming as acting Prime Minister pending a new Progressive Conservative leadership convention. Diefenbaker's allies persuaded him not to go through with the resignation. However, the furore caused by the cabinet split and Diefenbaker's rejecting a proposed deal with the Social Credit Party, whose support they had been relying on to remain in power since the previous election, resulted in Diefenbaker's government losing two non-confidence motions the next day and consequently falling.

The Liberal Party of Lester Pearson were twenty percentage points ahead of the Tories when the election was called, and it looked inevitable that they would form a majority government. Their campaign began to falter however, firstly when Pearson was struck down with a bout of ill-health which precluded him from actively campaigning, and more importantly when the U.S. Department of Defense leaked a document detailing the proposed missile defences (which ironically may have been done in an effort to help Pearson's campaign), allowing Diefenbaker to accuse the United States of wanting to use Canada as a decoy to lessen the potential damage to its cities in the event of a nuclear exchange with the Soviet Union. The Tories surged in the polls, leaving it briefly looking possible that they might not only be able to continue in power, but possibly even return to majority government status. Ultimately, the Liberals were able to regain the momentum with a platform promising that, if elected, they would begin their term with "60 Days of Decision" on several key questions, while Diefenbaker's repeated attacks on President Kennedy had limited effectiveness. The Tories' refusal to work with the Socreds also proved damaging, contributing to their losing ground in British Columbia, where they slipped to third place behind the Liberals and NDP.

Despite winning 41% of the vote, which is usually sufficient for ensuring the election of a majority government, the Liberals fell five seats short of their target. The Liberals formed a minority government that was dependent on the support of the social democratic New Democratic Party (NDP) in order to pass legislation.

The social-democratic NDP had been formed in 1961 by a socialist party, the Co-operative Commonwealth Federation, and by the Canadian Labour Congress. The 1963 election was the second vote contested by the NDP. The party won slightly fewer votes, and two fewer seats, than they had received in the 1962 election. They were again disappointed by the failure of their new partnership with the labour movement to produce an electoral breakthrough, particularly in the province of Ontario, which has the largest population and the largest number of seats in the House of Commons.

The Social Credit Party was unable to increase its representation in western Canada, and lost four of its Quebec seats - this despite gaining a slightly better share of the vote compared to 1962.  Indeed, 1963 represented the highest share the party would ever get. The continuing lop-sided result led to a split in the party when Thompson refused to step aside so that Réal Caouette could become party leader. Caouette and his followers left the Social Credit Party to sit as a separate social credit caucus, the Ralliement des créditistes.

National results 

Notes:

* The party did not nominate candidates in the previous election.

x - less than 0.005% of the popular vote

Results by province

xx - less than 0.05% of the popular vote

See also
 
List of Canadian federal general elections
List of political parties in Canada
26th Canadian Parliament

References

Further reading

External links
A Sordid Affair, by Norman Hillmer

 
1963 elections in Canada
1963
April 1963 events in Canada